Ahmed Bayazid (born 4 February 1959) is a Saudi Arabian footballer. He competed in the men's tournament at the 1984 Summer Olympics.

References

1959 births
Living people
Saudi Arabian footballers
Saudi Arabia international footballers
Olympic footballers of Saudi Arabia
Footballers at the 1984 Summer Olympics
Saudi Professional League players
Ittihad FC players
Place of birth missing (living people)
Association football midfielders
Asian Games medalists in football
Asian Games silver medalists for Israel
Footballers at the 1974 Asian Games
Medalists at the 1974 Asian Games